Animal Crack Box is a live box set by American experimental music act Animal Collective. It was released in limited quantities on May 11, 2009 by Catsup Plate Records.

Background 
After being discussed for years before its actual production, this vinyl-only box set finally received its promised treatment. On 18 March 2009 Catsup released the track listing and cover art. A test pressing was offered on eBay to benefit Doctors Without Borders. The commercial version, a single vinyl-only edition of 1000 copies, was made available for purchase on May 11, 2009 via Fusetron.

Printed by VGKids in Ypsilanti, MI during the early months of 2009.

Track listing

Personnel 
 Avey Tare
 Panda Bear
 Geologist
 Deakin

References 

Animal Collective albums
2009 live albums